Dionysos, commonly pronounced {dy-uh-ny'-suhs}, was established in Southern California, United States around the beginning of 2002. They are a professional three-piece band, who toured and traveled constantly in support of their music and message.  The band's name comes from ancient Greek mythology. Dionysos was the god of wine, theater, agriculture, madness, and ecstasy.  The band came up with the name after researching the works of the philosopher Friedrich Nietzsche.  Since its inception, the band's line-up has included founders: vocals/guitars Graham Boostrom, and vocals/bass Ray Delgado (rayray).  The latest member to join drummer is Zak Mcadamis, who joined the band in 2007.  Their first studio album was Be The Change, which was released in 2008.  The group was self-managed and built a large underground following across the United States.

Musical style 
Dionysos delivers a Harmony/soul/philosophical/rock n roll style, through a sometimes gentle and other times intense, medium. Their message has always been to deliver a pure artistic meaningful musical experience to the people who thirst for something with a little more substance in life. Their lyrics are generally filled with profound observations of the world, and philosophical questions that beckon the listener to come up with their own version of truth.  They deliver an experience that strives to take a listener to an intense psychedelic meditative state of mind through progressive rhythms, and vocal harmonies.

Discography 

 Dionysos - Self Titled (2004) (Not in Distribution)
 Be The Change (2008)
 Gift (2010)

Members
 Graham Boostrom - vocals/guitars
 Ray Delgado - vocals/bass
 Zak Mcadamis - drums

References

External links 
 Official Site
 Dionysos at Twitter

Progressive rock musical groups from California